Pirates of Galicia (PIRATA.GAL), is a political party in Galicia, Spain. It inherits the ideology from Pirate Party of Sweden, that seeks the reform of intellectual property and patent laws, the inclusion of direct democracy in the political system and the defense of Human Rights within and outside the Internet.

History

The party was founded on December 26, 2011, and it is officially admitted in the Register of Political Parties of the Ministry of Interior of Spain on January 26, 2012.

They ran elections for the first time on October 21, 2012, to the Galician Parliament in the provinces of Ourense and Pontevedra. The results were 336 votes in Ourense (0,18% over participation) and 1215 in Pontevedra (0,24% over participation).

References

External links
Official site

Galicia
Political parties in Galicia (Spain)
Political parties established in 2011
2011 establishments in Spain